Sigurður Ólafsson (born 18 September 1954) is an Icelandic former freestyle swimmer. He competed in four events at the 1976 Summer Olympics.

References

External links
 

1954 births
Living people
Sigurdur Olafsson
Sigurdur Olafsson
Swimmers at the 1976 Summer Olympics
Place of birth missing (living people)